Robot General Trading Co d.o.o.  is Bosnian domestic supermarket chain and group. The company's headquarters is located in Sarajevo, Bosnia and Herzegovina. It was founded in 1995 by Bosnian businessman Selver Oruč. The main activity of Robot is the production of household appliances through its own brand AWT – Appliance White Techniques (formerly known as BIRA Bihać) as well as trade, wholesale and retail of technical goods, consumer goods and food products. Robot sells merchandise through wholesale departments, and it was among the first companies in BiH that started to build modern shopping centers in major Bosnian cities.

In December 2015, Robot had 23 stores (Hypermarkets, Supermarkets or Shopping malls) opened in Bosnia and Herzegovina and more than 1,500 employees. The Group also operates in Croatia through the company "Robot Commerce" Split.

Robot Shopping Centar is usually formatted as large hypermarkets with additional facilities such as kids playground, cafes, boutiques and restaurants.

References

External links
 www.robot.ba

Supermarkets of Bosnia and Herzegovina
Retail companies established in 1995